{{taxobox
|name = Miscanthus × giganteus
|image = Miscanthus Bestand.JPG
|regnum = Plantae
|unranked_divisio = Angiosperms
|unranked_classis = Monocots
|unranked_ordo = Commelinids
|ordo = Poales
|familia = Poaceae
|subfamilia = Panicoideae
|genus = Miscanthus
|species = M. × giganteus
|binomial = Miscanthus × giganteus
|binomial_authority = J.M.Greef , Deuter ex Hodk., Renvoize 2001
|synonyms_ref=
|synonyms =
 Miscanthus × changii Y.N.Lee
 Miscanthus × latissimus Y.N.Lee
 Miscanthus × longiberbis (Hack.) Nakai
 Miscanthus × longiberbis var. changii (Y.N.Lee) Ibaragi & H.Ohashi
 Miscanthus × longiberbis f. ogiformis (Honda) Ibaragi
 Miscanthus matsumurae var. longiberbis Hack.
 Miscanthus × ogiformis Honda
 Miscanthus oligostachyus subsp. longiberbis (Hack.) T.Koyama
 Miscanthus sacchariflorus var. brevibarbis (Honda) Adati
 Miscanthus sinensis 'Giganteus'
}}Miscanthus × giganteus, also known as the giant miscanthus, is a sterile hybrid of Miscanthus sinensis and Miscanthus sacchariflorus. It is a perennial grass with bamboo-like stems that can grow to heights of 3– in one season (from the third season onwards). Just like Pennisetum purpureum, Arundo donax and Saccharum ravennae, it is also called elephant grass.Miscanthus × giganteus' perennial nature, its ability to grow on marginal land, its water efficiency, non-invasiveness, low fertilizer needs, significant carbon sequestration and high yield have sparked significant interest among researchers, with some arguing that it has "ideal" energy crop properties. Some argue that it can provide negative emissions, while others highlight its water cleaning and soil enhancing qualities. There are practical and economic challenges related to its use in the existing, fossil based combustion infrastructure, however. Torrefaction and other fuel upgrading techniques are being explored as countermeasures to this problem.

Use areasMiscanthus × giganteus is mainly used as raw material for solid biofuels. It can be burned directly, or processed further into pellets or briquettes. It can also be used as raw material for liquid biofuels or biogas.

Alternatively, it is also possible to use miscanthus as a building material, and as insulation. Materials produced from miscanthus include fiberboards, composite miscanthus/wood particleboards, and blocks. It can be used as raw material for pulp and fibers as well as molded products such as eco-friendly disposable plates, cups, cartons, etc. The pulp can be processed further into methylcellulose and used as a food additive and in many industrial applications. Miscanthus fiber provides raw material for reinforcement of biocomposite or synthetic materials. In agriculture, miscanthus straw is used in soil mulching to retain soil moisture, inhibit weed growth, and prevent erosion. Further, miscanthus' high carbon to nitrogen ratio makes it inhospitable to many microbes, creating a clean bedding for poultry, cattle, pigs, horses, and companion animals. Miscanthus used as horse bedding can be combined with making organic fertilizer. Miscanthus can also be used as a fiber source in pet food.

Life cycle
Rhizome propagation is a labor-intensive way of planting new crops, but only happens once during a crop's lifetime. Alternative propagation techniques are available, or in development. For seed based propagation, a halving of the cost is predicted.

Management

The plant requires little if any herbicide, and only at the beginning of its first two seasons.  Afterwards the dense canopy and the mulch formed by dead leaves effectively reduces weed growth. Because of miscanthus' high nitrogen use efficiency, fertilizer is also usually not needed. Mulch film, on the other hand, helps both M. x giganteus and various seed based hybrids to grow faster and taller, with a larger number of stems per plant, effectively reducing the establishment phase from three years to two. The reason seems to be that this plastic film keeps the humidity in the topsoil and increases the temperature.

Yield

Miscanthus is unusually efficient at turning solar radiation into biomass, and its water use efficiency is among the highest of any crop. It has twice the water use efficiency of its fellow C4 plant maize, twice the efficiency as the C3 energy crop willow (Salix viminalis), and four times the efficiency as the C3 plant wheat. The typical UK winter harvest of 11–14 tonnes dry mass per hectare produce  of energy per year. This compares favorably to maize, oil seed rape, and wheat/sugar beet. In the USA, M. × giganteus has been shown to yield two times more than switchgrass.

In many locations in Europe, miscanthus plantations produce more net energy than any competing energy crop, because of high yields and low demands for farm management energy use. The main competitors yieldwise is willow and poplar, grown at short rotation coppice (SRC) or short rotation forestry (SRF) plantations. In the northern parts of Europe, willow and poplar approach and sometimes exceed miscanthus winter yields in the same location. Globally, FAO estimates that forest plantation yields range from  dry mass per year. IPCC estimates that global plantation forest yields (before harvest losses) varies between 0.4 and 25 tonnes, with most plantations producing between 5 and 15 tonnes. Natural forests have lower yields however, between 0.1 and 9.3 dry tonnes per hectare per year, with most natural forests producing between 1 and 4 tonnes. The average yield for natural forests in temperate climates is 1.5 to 2 dry tonnes per hectare per year before harvest related losses.

The miscanthus peak yield is reached at the end of summer but harvest is typically delayed until winter or early spring. Yield is roughly one third lower at this point because of leaves drop, but the combustion quality is higher (due to lower amounts of moisture and chlorine in the biomass). Delayed harvest also allows nitrogen to move back into the rhizome for use by the plant in the following growing season.

Individual trials show peak yields of 17 tonnes (Denmark), 17–30 tonnes (Germany and Austria), 25 tonnes (The Netherlands), 39 tonnes (Portugal), and 42–49 tonnes (France). Individual trials also show delayed (winter/spring) yields of 10 tonnes (Denmark), 11–17 tonnes (UK), 14 tonnes (Spain), 10–20 tonnes (Germany), 16–17 tonnes (The Netherlands), 22 tonnes (Austria), 20–25 tonnes (Italy), 26–30 tonnes (Portugal) and 30 tonnes (France). A different trial showed delayed yields of 15 tonnes in Germany. Researchers have estimated a mean delayed yield of both 10 tonnes for the UK, and between 10.5 and 15 tonnes for the UK.

As can be seen, yields are highest in southern Europe; in general 25–30 tonnes under rainfed conditions (if harvest is delayed until winter/spring). With irrigation, individual trials in Portugal yielded 36 tonnes, Italy 34–38 tonnes, and Greece 38–44 tonnes. Trials in Illinois, USA, yielded . Like in Europe, yields increase as you move south.

For biomass in general, yields are expected to be higher in tropical climates than in temperate climates. For Miscanthus × giganteus specifically, researchers disagree about the yield potential however. Since there are no actual field trials done in the tropics yet, only estimates based on theory is possible. Some argue that the plant tolerates heat, and that the yield potential is between 60 and 100 dry tonnes per hectare per year. Others argue that heat tolerance is low, and subsequently predict low yields. There is agreement that other miscanthus genotypes have a high tolerance for heat, e.g. Miscanthus Sinensis. Other elephant grass types clearly suited to high temperatures (different napier variants) have been shown to yield up to 80 tonnes per hectare, and commercial napier grass developers advertise yields of roughly 100 dry tonnes per hectare per year, provided there is an adequate amount of rain or irrigation available (100 mm per month).

In general, yield expectations are lower for marginal land than for arable land in the same geographical area. Marginal land is land with issues that limits growth, for instance low water and nutrient storage capacity, high salinity, toxic elements, poor texture, shallow soil depth, poor drainage, low fertility, or steep terrain. Depending on how the term is defined, between 1.1 and 6.7 billion hectares of marginal land exists in the world. For comparison, Europe consists of roughly 1 billion hectares (10 million km2, or 3.9 million square miles), and Asia 4.5 billion hectares (45 million km2, or 17 million square miles). According to IRENA (International Renewable Energy Agency), 1.5 billion hectares of land is currently used for food production globally, while "[...] about 1.4 billion ha [hectares] additional land is suitable but unused to date and thus could be allocated for bioenergy supply in the future." The IPCC estimates that there is between 0.32 and 1.4 billion hectares of marginal land suitable for bioenergy in the world. The EU project MAGIC estimates that there is 45 million hectares (449 901 km2; comparable to Sweden in size) of marginal land suitable for Miscanthus × giganteus plantations in the European Union, with three classes of expected yield (high: 30–40 t/ha/yr, medium: 20–30 t/ha/yr, and low: 0–20 t/ha/yr).Miscanthus × giganteus is either moderately or highly tolerant of heat, drought, flooding, salinity (below 100 mM), and cool soil temperatures (down to −3.4 °C, or 25 °F). This robustness makes it possible to establish relatively high-yielding miscanthus fields on marginal land, for instance in coastal areas, damp habitats, grasslands, abandoned milling sites, forest edges, streamsides, foothills and mountain slopes. 99% of Europe's saline, marginal lands can be used for M. × giganteus plantations, with only an expected maximum yield loss of 11%. Since salinity up to 200 mM does not affect roots and rhizomes, carbon sequestration carry on unaffected. Researchers found a yield loss of 36% on a marginal site limited by low temperatures (Moscow), compared to maximum yield on arable land in central Europe. They also found a yield loss of 21% on a marginal site limited by drought (Turkey), compared to maximum yields on arable soil in central Europe.

Researchers predict an average yield of 14.6 dry tonnes per hectare per year for miscanthus on marginal land in China, 12.6% below expected average yield on arable land. They calculate that miscanthus on marginal land in China can produce 31.7 EJ (exajoule) of energy annually, an amount equivalent to 39% of the country's 2019 coal consumption. An individual trial in Ireland showed an average delayed yield of 9 tonnes per hectare per year on a site troubled by low temperatures, waterlogging during winter, and dried out, cracked soil during summer. Researchers reported yields ranging from 17 to 31 tonnes on a variety of soils in the USA (Kentucky, Illinois, Nebraska, New Jersey, Virginia and North Carolina), and compared those to a specific trial with lightly fertilised 3 year old miscanthus crops on eroded claypan soils, common in the Midwest (a claypan is a layer of clay beneath the topsoil, which make the soil marginal for grain crops.) The miscanthus crops yielded 20–24 tonnes per hectare per year (delayed harvest). The authors concluded that "[...] eroded claypan soils may not negatively impact Miscanthus establishment or yield."

Yield prediction software Miscanfor predicts that 30 days of soil dryness is the mean maximum amount of time a miscanthus crop can endure before wilting, while 60 days is the maximum before its rhizomes are killed and the crop has to be replanted. In addition to adequate rainfall, soil water holding capacity is important for high yields, especially in dry periods. In soils with poor water holding capacity, irrigation in the establishment season is important because it allows the roots to reach far deeper underground, thereby increasing the plants' ability to collect water.

Miscanthus grows relatively well in soils contaminated by metals, or by industrial activities in general. For instance, in one trial, it was found that M. × giganteus absorbed 52% of the lead content and 19% of the arsenic content in the soil after three months. The absorption stabilizes the pollutants so they don't travel into the air (as dust), into ground water, neighbouring surface waters, or neighbouring areas used for food production. If contaminated miscanthus is used as fuel, the combustion site need to install the appropriate equipment to handle this situation. On the whole though, "[…] Miscanthus is [a] suitable crop for combining biomass production and ecological restoration of contaminated and marginal land." Researchers argue that because of miscanthus' ability to be "[…] productive on lower grade agricultural land, including heavy metal contaminated and saline soils […]" it can "[…] contribute to the sustainable intensification of agriculture, allowing farmers to diversify and provide biomass for an expanding market without compromising food security."

 Yield – comparison with other energy sources 
To calculate land use requirements for different kinds of energy production, it is essential to know the relevant surface power production densities (e.g. power production per square metre). The surface power production density for miscanthus plantations sourced for heat production is 0.6 W/m2 per 10 tonnes of yield per hectare. In other words, a 30 tonne yield equals 1.8 W/m2, which effectively puts the power density of a plantation with this yield in between the average power densities of wind and hydro (see below). Total net electric output is 6,508 MW.

The reason for the low power density for other kinds of biofuels is a combination of low yields and only partial utilization of the plant (for instance, ethanol is typically made from sugarcane's sugar content or corn's starch content, while biodiesel is often made from the oil content in rapeseed or soybean). Furthermore conversion losses occur in alcoholic fermentation (an exothermic process) of sugars into ethanol.

When used for ethanol production, miscanthus plantations with a yield of 15 tonnes per hectare per year generate only 0.40 W/m2. Corn fields generate 0.26 W/m2 (yield 10 t/ha). In Brazil sugarcane fields typically generate 0.41 W/m2. Winter wheat (USA) generates 0.08 W/m2 and German wheat generates 0.30 W/m2. When grown for jet fuel, soybean generates 0.06 W/m2, while palm oil generates 0.65 W/m2. Jathropa grown on marginal land generate 0.20 W/m2. When grown for biodiesel, rapeseed generate 0.12 W/m2 (EU average). In contrast to miscanthus cultivation and solid fuel production, typical liquid biofuel raw material cultivation and fuel production require large energy inputs. When these inputs are compensated for (when used energy is subtracted from produced energy), power density drops further down: Rapeseed based biodiesel production in the Netherlands have the highest energy efficiency in the EU with an adjusted power density of 0.08 W/m2, while sugar beets based bioethanol produced in Spain have the lowest, at only 0.02 W/m2.

Using solid biomass for energy purposes is more efficient than using liquids, as the whole plant can be utilized. For instance, corn plantations producing solid biomass for combustion generate more than double the amount of power per square metre compared to corn plantations producing for ethanol, when the yield is the same: 10 t/ha generates 0.60 W/m2 and 0.26 W/m2 respectively, without compensating for energy input. It has been estimated that large-scale plantations with pines, acacias, poplars and willows in temperate regions achieve yields of 5–15 dry tonnes per hectare per year, which means a surface power production density of 0.30–0.90 W/m2. For similarly large plantations, with eucalyptus, acacia, leucaena, pinus and dalbergia in tropical and subtropical regions, yields are typically 20–25 t/ha, which means a surface power production density of 1.20–1.50 W/m2. Note that this yield estimate is somewhat higher than the FAO estimate above, and it effectively put also these plantations' power densities in-between the densities of wind and hydro. In Brazil, the average yield for eucalyptus is 21 t/ha, but in Africa, India and Southeast Asia, typical eucalyptus yields are below 10 t/ha.

When calculating power production per square metre, every t/ha of dry biomass yield increases a plantation's power production by 0.06 W/m2. As mentioned above, the world average for wind, hydro and solar power production is 1 W/m2, 3 W/m2 and 5 W/m2 respectively. In order to match these power densities, plantation yields must reach 17 t/ha, 50 t/ha and 83 t/ha for wind, hydro and solar respectively. To match the world average for biofuels (0.3 W/m2), plantations need to produce 5 tonnes of dry mass per hectare per year.

Note however that yields need to be adjusted to compensate for the amount of moisture in the biomass (evaporating moisture in order to reach the ignition point is usually wasted energy). The moisture of biomass straw or bales varies with the surrounding air humidity and eventual pre-drying measures, while pellets have a standardized (ISO-defined) moisture content of below 10% (wood pellets) and below 15% (other pellets). Likewise, for wind, hydro and solar, power line transmission losses amounts to roughly 8% globally and should be accounted for. If biomass is to be utilized for electricity production rather than heat production, yields have to be roughly tripled in order to compete with wind, hydro and solar, as the current heat to electricity conversion efficiency (thermal efficiency) is only 30–40% in thermal power plants. However cogeneration and combined cycle power plants can achieve higher efficiencies by making better use of waste heat. When simply comparing the surface power production densities of biofuel, wind, hydro and solar, without regard for cost, this effectively pushes both hydro and solar power out of reach of even the highest yielding elephant grass plantations, power density wise.

Carbon sequestration
Soil carbon input/output

Plants sequester carbon through photosynthesis, a sunlight-driven process where  and water are absorbed and then combined to form carbohydrates. The absorbed carbon is released back to the atmosphere as  when the harvested biomass is combusted, but the belowground parts of the plant (roots and rhizomes) remain in the soil and can potentially add substantial amounts of carbon to the soil over the years.

The amount of carbon in the soil is determined by the input rate of new carbon and the decay rate of old carbon. Soil carbon that is derived from plants is a continuum, ranging from living biomass to humus, and it decays in different stages. It can be divided into an active, a slow and a passive pool, with mean carbon residence times (MRT) of 0.1–2 years, 15–100 years, and 500–5000 years for the three pools, respectively. Carbon below  was stable. The actual rate of carbon decay in a particular location depends on many factors, for instance plant species, soil type, temperature and humidity. Researchers did not find evidence of decreasing soil organic carbon accumulation as their test miscanthus crop aged, which meant no carbon saturation at that site for 20 years. Others estimate 30–50 years of continuous soil carbon increase after a land use change from annual to perennial crops. The amount of carbon in the ground under miscanthus fields is expected to increase during the entire life of the crop, but possibly with a slow start because of the initial tilling (plowing, digging) and the relatively low amounts of carbon input in the establishment phase. (Tilling helps the soil microbe populations to decompose the available carbon, producing CO2.) Researchers argue that the high carbon storage below miscanthus fields is because of high proportions of pre- and direct-harvest residues (e.g. dead leaves), direct humus accumulation, a well-developed and deep-reaching root system, low decomposition rates of plant residues due to high carbon to nitrogen ratios, and absence of tillage (which leads to less soil aeration.)

Net annual carbon accumulation
According to the IPCC, an increase in soil carbon is important for both climate mitigation and climate adaptation. A number of studies try to quantify the miscanthus-caused increase in soil carbon in various locations and under various circumstances:

Dondini et al. found 32 tonnes more carbon per hectare under a 14 year old miscanthus field than in the control site, suggesting a mean carbon accumulation rate of 2.29 tonnes per hectare per year, or 38% of total harvested carbon per year. Likewise, Milner et al. suggest a mean carbon accumulation rate for the whole of the UK of 2.28 tonnes (also 38% of total harvested carbon per year), given that some unprofitable land (0.4% of total) is excluded. Nakajima et al. found a mean accumulation rate of 1.96 tonnes below a university test site in Sapporo, Japan, equivalent to 16% of total harvested carbon per year. The test was shorter though, only 6 years. Hansen et al. found an accumulation rate of 0.97 tonne per year over 16 years under a test site in Hornum, Denmark, equivalent to 28% of total harvested carbon per year. McCalmont et al. compared a number of individual European reports, and found accumulation rates ranging from 0.42 to 3.8 tonnes, with a mean accumulation rate of 1.84 tonne, or 25% of total harvested carbon per year. Variation in annual soil carbon change is high during the first 2–5 years after planting, but after 15 years the variation is negligible.

Transport and combustion challenges
Overview

Biomass in general, including miscanthus, have different properties compared to coal, for instance when it comes to handling and transport, grinding, and combustion. This makes sharing the same logistics, grinding and combustion infrastructure difficult. Often new biomass handling facilities have to be built instead, which increases cost. Together with the relatively high cost of feedstock, this often leads to a situation where biomass projects have to receive subsidies to be economically viable. A number of fuel upgrading technologies are currently being explored, however, that make biomass more compatible with the existing infrastructure. The most mature of these is torrefaction, basically an advanced roasting technique which—when combined with pelleting or briquetting—significantly influences handling and transport properties, grindability and combustion efficiency.

Energy density and transport costs

Torrefaction works hand in hand with this trend towards a denser and therefore cheaper to transport product, specifically by increasing the product's energy density. Torrefaction removes (by gasification) the parts of the biomass that has the lowest energy content, while the parts with the highest energy content remain. That is, approximately 30% of the biomass is converted to gas during the torrefaction process (and potentially used to power the process), while 70% remains, usually in the form of compacted pellets or briquettes. This solid product contains approximately 85% of the original biomass energy however. Basically the mass part has shrunk more than the energy part, and the consequence is that the calorific value of torrefied biomass increases significantly, to the extent that it can compete with energy dense coals used for electricity generation (steam/thermal coals). Torrefaction can be done "autothermic" (i.e. the required energy is delivered by partial combustion of the to-be-torrefied material) or "heterothermic" (i.e. the required process heat is delivered from outside sources). In the heterothermic case, torrefaction can also serve as an indirect method of energy storage as the material can be torrefied when power is cheap and plentiful and the gaseous and/or solid products can be burned in a peaking power plant when power is scarce. The gaseous products of torrefaction are similar to syngas and can be used for various processes in the chemical industry in a similar fashion as fossil fuels. The high-carbon solid products of torrefaction can be deposited in the soil as biochar (provided the level of various pollutants is low enough) or used to produce hydrogen in the water–gas shift reaction if simply burning it is not desirable.

The higher energy density means lower transportation costs, and a decrease in transport-related greenhouse gas emissions. The IEA has calculated how much energy is saved, and how much greenhouse gas emissions is reduced, when switching from regular to torrefied pellets/briquettes. When making torrefied pellets and shipping them from Indonesia to Japan, the minimum amount of energy that is saved is 6.7%, and the minimum amount of greenhouse gas emissions avoided is 14%. This increases to 10.3% energy use savings and 33% greenhouse gas emission avoidance when making and shipping minimum 50 mm briquettes instead of pellets (briquette production requires less energy). The longer the route, the bigger the savings.

Water absorption and transport costs
Torrefaction also converts the biomass from a hydrophilic (water absorbing) to a hydrophobic (water repelling) state. Water repelling briquettes can be transported and stored outside, which simplifies the logistics operation and decreases cost. Torrefaction also stops the biological activity in the biomass (including rotting), and reduces the risk of fire.

Uniformity and customization
Generally, torrefaction is seen as a gateway for converting a range of very diverse feedstocks into a uniform and therefore easier to deal with fuel. The fuel's parameters can be changed to meet customers demands, for instance type of feedstock, torrefaction degree, geometrical form, durability, water resistance, and ash composition. The possibility to use different types of feedstock improves the fuel's availability and supply reliability.

Grindability

Unprocessed M. × giganteus has strong fibers, making grinding into equally sized, very small particles (below 75 µm / 0.075 mm) difficult to achieve. Coal chunks are typically ground to that size because such small, even particles combust stabler and more efficient. While coal has a score on the Hardgrove Grindability Index (HGI) of 30–100 (higher numbers mean it is easier to grind), unprocessed miscanthus has a score of 0. During torrefaction however, "[…] the hemi-cellulose fraction which is responsible for the fibrous nature of biomass is degraded, thereby improving its grindability." The IEA estimates a HGI of 23–53 for torrefied biomass in general, and estimates an 80–90% drop in energy use required to grind biomass which has been torrefied. Other researchers have measured a HGI of 79 for torrefied miscanthus. UK coal scores between 40 and 60 on the HGI scale.

The relatively easy grinding of torrefied miscanthus makes a cost-effective conversion to fine particles possible, which subsequently makes efficient combustion possible. Researchers have found that the level of unburnt carbon decreases when torrefied biomass is used, and that flames "[…] were stable during 50% cofiring and for the 100% case as a result of sufficient fuel particle fineness."

Chlorine and corrosion
Like many types of biomass except wood, miscanthus biomass has a relatively high chlorine amount, which is problematic in a combustion scenario because, the "[…] likelihood of corrosion depends significantly on the content of chlorine in the fuel […]." Likewise, research show that "[…] the release of Cl-associated [chlorine-associated] species during combustion is the main cause of the induced active corrosion in the grate combustion of biomass." Chlorine in different forms, in particular combined with potassium as potassium chloride, condensates on relatively cooler surfaces inside the boiler and creates a corrosive deposit layer. The corrosion damages the boiler, and in addition the physical deposit layer itself reduce heat transfer efficiency, most critically inside the heat exchange mechanism. Chlorine and potassium also lowers the ash melting point considerably compared to coal. Melted ash, known as slag or clinker, sticks to the bottom of the boiler, and increase maintenance costs.

In order to reduce chlorine (and moisture) content, the miscanthus harvest is usually delayed until winter or early spring, but this practice is still not enough of a countermeasure to achieve corrosion-free combustion.

Chlorine release during the torrefaction process itself is more manageable than chlorine release during combustion, because "[…] the prevailing temperatures during the former process are below the melting and vaporization temperatures of the alkali salts of chlorine, thus minimizing their risks of slagging, fouling and corrosion in furnaces." For potassium, only a 30% reduction is expected. However, potassium is dependent on chlorine to form potassium chloride; with a low level of chlorine, the potassium chloride deposits reduce proportionally.

Coal similarity
Researchers therefore argue that the "[…] process of torrefaction transforms the chemical and physical properties of raw biomass into those similar to coal, which enables utilization with high substitution ratios of biomass in existing coal-fired boilers without any major modifications." Torrefaction removes moisture and create a grindable, hydrophobic and solid product with an increased energy density, which means that torrefied fuel no longer requires "[…] separate handling facilities when co-fired with coal in existing power stations." The same compatibility is also achieved for biomass processed by hydrothermal carbonization, sometimes called "wet" torrefaction.

Researchers note however that "[…] torrefaction is a more complex process than initially anticipated" and state that "[…] torrefaction of biomass is still an experimental technology […]." Michael Wild, president of the International Biomass Torrefaction Council, stated in 2015 that the torrefaction sector is "[…] in its optimisation phase […]." He mentions process integration, energy and mass efficiency, mechanical compression and product quality as the variables most important to master at this point in the sector's development.

Environmental impacts
Carbon neutrality
Typically, perennial crops sequester more carbon than annual crops because the root buildup is allowed to continue undisturbed over many years. Also, perennial crops avoid the yearly tillage procedures (plowing, digging) associated with growing annual crops. Tilling helps the soil microbe populations to decompose the available carbon, producing CO2.

Fundamentally, the below-ground carbon accumulation works as a greenhouse gas mitigation tool because it removes carbon from the above-ground carbon circulation (the circulation from plant to atmosphere and back into new plants.) The above-ground circulation is driven by photosynthesis and combustion—first, a plant absorb CO2 and assimilates it as carbon in its tissue both above and below ground. When the above-ground carbon is harvested and then burned, the CO2 molecule is formed yet again and released back into the atmosphere. Then, an equivalent amount of CO2 is absorbed back by next season's growth, and the cycle repeats.

This above-ground cycle has the potential to be carbon neutral, but of course the human involvement in operating and guiding the cycle means additional energy input, often coming from fossil sources. If the fossil energy spent on the operation is high compared to the amount of energy produced, the total CO2 footprint can approach, match or even exceed the CO2 footprint originating from burning fossil fuels exclusively, as has been shown to be the case for several first-generation biofuel projects. Transport fuels might be worse than solid fuels in this regard.

The problem can be dealt with both from the perspective of increasing the amount of carbon that is stored below ground (see Carbon sequestration, above), and from the perspective of decreasing fossil fuel input to the above-ground operation. If enough carbon is stored below ground, it can compensate for the total lifecycle emissions of a particular biofuel. Likewise, if the above-ground emissions decreases, less below-ground carbon storage is needed for the biofuel to become carbon neutral or negative.

It is the total amount of CO2 equivalent emissions and absorption together that determines if an energy crop project is carbon positive, carbon neutral or carbon negative. If emissions during agriculture, processing, transport and combustion are higher than what is absorbed, both above and below ground during crop growth, the project is carbon positive. Likewise, if total absorption over time is higher than total emissions, the project is carbon negative. To sum up, carbon negativity is possible when net carbon accumulation more than compensates for net lifecycle greenhouse gas emissions.

Researchers argue that a miscanthus crop with a yield of 10 tonnes per hectare per year store enough carbon to compensate for both agriculture, processing and transport related emissions. The chart on the right displays two carbon negative miscanthus production pathways, and two carbon positive poplar production pathways, represented in gram CO2-equivalents per megajoule. The bars are sequential and move up and down as atmospheric CO2 is estimated to increase and decrease. The grey/blue bars represent agriculture, processing and transport related emissions, the green bars represents soil carbon change, and the yellow diamonds represent total final emissions. The second chart displays the mean yields necessary to achieve long-term carbon negativity for soils with different amounts of existing carbon.

Other researchers make the same point for miscanthus in Germany, with a yield of 15 dry tonnes per hectare per year, and carbon storage of 1.1 tonnes per hectare per year: "Miscanthus is one of the very few crops worldwide that reaches true CO2 neutrality and may function as a CO2 sink. [...] Related to the combustion of fuel oil, the direct and indirect greenhouse gas emissions can be reduced by a minimum of 96% through the combustion of Miscanthus straw [...]. Due to the C‐sequestration [carbon storage] during Miscanthus growth, this results in a CO2‐eq mitigation potential of 117%".Successful storage is dependent on planting sites, as the best soils are those that are currently low in carbon. The varied results displayed in the chart highlights this fact. For the UK, successful storage is expected for arable land over most of England and Wales, with unsuccessful storage expected in parts of Scotland, due to already carbon rich soils (existing woodland). Also, for Scotland, the relatively lower yields in this colder climate makes CO2 negativity harder to achieve. Soils already rich in carbon include peatland and mature forest. The most successful carbon storage in the UK takes place below improved grassland. However, since carbon content of grasslands vary considerably, so does the success rate of land use changes from grasslands to perennial. Even though the net carbon storage below perennial energy crops like miscanthus greatly exceeds the net carbon storage below grassland, forest and arable crops, carbon input from miscanthus is simply too low to compensate for the loss of existing soil carbon during the early establishment phase. Over time however, soil carbon may increase, also for grassland.

Researchers have ranked the specific land-use-change-related climate benefits (this excludes the climate benefits that originates from replacing fossil fuels) for different crops over a 30 year time frame on different types of grassland, and concludes that native grassland have a climate-related value (called GHGV) of 200, while lightly fertilised M × giganteus crops established on formerly annually tilled soil have a value of 160. CRP grassland have a value of 125 (protected grassland established on former cropland.) Native prairie-mix have a value of 115 (non-fertilised native prairie grasses with other prairie-native species included, established on formerly annually tilled cropland.) Pasture grassland have a value of 72.

 Comparisons 
Researchers conclude that miscanthus crops "[…] almost always has a smaller environmental footprint than first generation annual bioenergy ones [...]." Second generation perennial grasses (miscanthus and switchgrass) planted on arable land store on average five times more carbon in the ground than short rotation coppice or short rotation forestry plantations (poplar and willow). Compared to fossil fuels, and without including the benefits of below-ground carbon storage in the calculation, miscanthus fuel has a greenhouse gas cost of 0.4–1.6 grams CO2-equivalents per megajoule, compared to 33 grams for coal, 22 for liquefied natural gas, 16 for North Sea gas, and 4 for wood chips imported to Britain from the USA.

Other researchers argue that the mean energy input/output ratios for miscanthus is 10 times better than for annual crops, and that greenhouse gas emissions are 20–30 times better than for fossil fuels. Miscanthus chips for heating saved 22.3 tonnes of CO2 emissions per hectare per year in the UK, while maize for heating and power saved 6.3. Rapeseed for biodiesel saved 3.2. Other researchers have similar conclusions. It is therefore expected that miscanthus plantations will grow large in Europe in the coming decades. In 2021, the UK government declared that land areas set aside for short rotation forestry and perennial energy crops (including miscanthus), will increase from 10.000 up to 704.000 hectares. Researchers argue that after some initial discussion, there is now (2018) consensus in the scientific community that "[…] the GHG [greenhouse gas] balance of perennial bioenergy crop cultivation will often be favourable […]", also when considering the implicit direct and indirect land use changes.

Biodiversity

Below ground, researchers have found that the number of earthworm species per square metre was 5.1 for miscanthus, 3 for maize, and 6.4 for fallow (totally unattended land), and state that "[…] it was clearly found that land-use intensity was the dominant regressor for earthworm abundance and total number of species." Because the extensive leaf litter on the ground helps the soil to stay moist, and also protect from predators, they conclude that "[…] Miscanthus had quite positive effects on earthworm communities […]" and recommend that "[…] Miscanthus may facilitate a diverse earthworm community even in intensive agricultural landscapes." Others argue that the activity of certain bacteria belonging to the Pseudomonadota (formerly proteobacteria) group almost doubles in the presence of M. × giganteus root exudates.

Above ground, young miscanthus stands sustain high plant species diversity, but as the miscanthus stands mature, the canopy closes, and less sunlight reach the competing weeds. In this situation it gets harder for the weeds to survive. After canopy closure, 16 different weed species per 25 m2 plot was found. The dense canopy works as protection for other life-forms though; "[…] Miscanthus stands are usually reported to support farm biodiversity, providing habitat for birds, insects, and small mammals […]." Supporting this view, other researchers argue that the flora below the canopy provides food for butterflies, other insects and their predators, and 40 species of birds.

The miscanthus overwinter vegetative structure provide an important cover and habitat resource, with high levels of diversity in comparison with annual crops. This effect is particularly evident for beetles, flies, and birds. The miscanthus crop offers a different ecological niche for each season—researchers attribute this to the continually evolving structural heterogeneity of a miscanthus crop, with different species finding shelter at different times during its development—woodland birds find shelter in the winter and farmland birds in the summer. For birds, 0.92 breeding pairs species per hectare (0.37 per acre) was found in a miscanthus field, compared to 0.28 (0.11) in a nearby wheat field. Due to the high carbon to nitrogen ratio, it is in the field's margins and interspersed woodlands that the majority of the food resources are to be found. Miscanthus fields work as barriers against chemical leaching into these key habitats however.

Other researchers argue that miscanthus crops provide better biodiversity than cereal crops, with three times as many spiders and earthworms as cereal. Brown hare, stoat, mice, vole, shrew, fox and rabbit are some of the species that are observed in miscanthus crops. The crop act as both a nesting habitat and a wildlife corridor connecting different habitats.

Water quality
Miscanthus fields leads to significantly improved water quality because of significantly less nitrate leaching. There is drastically reduced nitrate leaching from miscanthus fields compared to the typical maize/soy rotation because of low or zero fertilizer requirements, the continuous presence of a plant root sink for nitrogen, and the efficient internal recycling of nutrients by perennial grass species. A recent study concluded that miscanthus had on average nine times less subsurface loss of nitrate compared to maize or maize grown in rotation with soya bean.

Soil quality
The fibrous, extensive miscanthus rooting system and the lack of tillage disturbance improves infiltration, hydraulic conductivity and water storage compared to annual row crops, and results in the porous and low bulk density soil typical under perennial grasses, with water holding capabilities expected to increase by 100–150 mm. Miscanthus improves carbon input to the soil, and promote microorganism activity and diversity, which are important for soil particle aggregation and rehabilitation processes. On a former fly ash deposit site, with alkaline pH, nutrient deficiency, and little water-holding capacity, a miscanthus crop was successfully established—in the sense that the roots and rhizomes grew quite well, supporting and enhancing nitrification processes, although the above-ground dry weight yield was low because of the conditions. The ability to improve soil quality even on contaminated land is seen as a useful feature, especially in a situation where organic amendments can be added. For instance, there is a great potential to increase yield on contaminated marginal land low in nutrients by fertilizing it with nutrient-rich sewage sludge or wastewater. This practice offer the three-fold advantage of improving soil productivity, increasing biomass yields, and reducing costs for treatment and disposal of sewage sludge in line with the specific legislation in each country.

InvasivenessMiscanthus × giganteus parents on both sides, M. sinensis and M. sacchariflorus'', are both potentially invasive species, because they both produce viable seeds. M. × giganteus does not produce viable seeds however, and researchers claim that "[...] there has been no report on the threat of invasion due to rhizome growth extension from long-term commercial plantations to neighbouring arable land."

Sustainability

Researchers argue that analyses "[...] of the environmental impacts of miscanthus cultivation on a range of factors, including greenhouse gas mitigation, show that the benefits outweigh the costs in most cases." Others argue that although there is room for more research, "[...] clear indications of environmental sustainability do emerge." In addition to the greenhouse gas mitigation potential, miscanthus' "[…] perennial nature and belowground biomass improves soil structure, increases water-holding capacity (up by ), and reduces run-off and erosion. Overwinter ripening increases landscape structural resources for wildlife. Reduced management intensity promotes earthworm diversity and abundance although poor litter palatability may reduce individual biomass. Chemical leaching into field boundaries is lower than comparable agriculture, improving soil and water habitat quality." A change from first generation to second generation energy crops like miscanthus is environmentally beneficial because of improved farm-scale biodiversity, predation and a net positive greenhouse gas mitigation effect. The benefits are primarily a consequence of low inputs and the longer management cycles associated with second generation (2G) crops. If land use tensions are mitigated, reasonable yields obtained, and low carbon soils targeted, there are many cases where low-input perennial crops like miscanthus "[...] can provide significant GHG [greenhouse gas] savings compared to fossil fuel alternatives [...]." In contrast to annual crops, miscanthus have low nitrogen input requirements, low GHG emissions, sequesters soil carbon due to reduced tillage, and can be economically viable on marginal land. Researchers agree that in recent years, "[...] a more nuanced understanding of the environmental benefits and risks of bioenergy has emerged, and it has become clear that perennial bioenergy crops have far greater potential to deliver significant GHG savings than the conventional crops currently being grown for biofuel production around the world (e.g. corn, palm oil and oilseed rape)." They also agree that "[...] the direct impacts of dedicated perennial bioenergy crops on soil carbon and N2O are increasingly well understood, and are often consistent with significant lifecycle GHG mitigation from bioenergy relative to conventional energy sources."

Practical farming considerations
For practical farming advice, see Iowa State University's "Giant Miscanthus Establishment" PDF. See also the best practice manual jointly developed by Teagasc (the agriculture and food development authority in Ireland) and AFBI (the Agri-Food and Biosciences Institute, also Ireland).

References

Quotes and comments

Shortened footnotes

Bibliography

External links
EU MAGIC Map over marginal land areas suitable for miscanthus plantations in Europe.
FAO GSOC map Global soil organic carbon map from FAO, shows the distribution of the world's soil organic carbon.
Aberystwyth University Research on Miscanthus breeding and agronomics.
GRACE EU research program for large-scale Miscanthus production on marginal land.
Miscanthus Breeding Home page for 5 miscanthus research programmes (with informative miscanthus video).
SERC Sustainable Energy Research Center at Mississippi State University.
University of Illinois Institution for research on Miscanthus.

giganteus
Energy crops
Hybrid plants